The McNeese–Northwestern State football rivalry is an American college football rivalry between the McNeese Cowboys and the Northwestern State Demons. Both schools are members of the University of Louisiana System, and compete together as members of the Southland Conference (SLC).

History
The two teams have met 72 times on the football field, with McNeese currently holding a 48–23–1 edge in the all-time series.

Game results

See also  
 List of NCAA college football rivalry games

References

College football rivalries in the United States
McNeese Cowboys football
Northwestern State Demons football
1951 establishments in Louisiana